Heberth Gutiérrez García (born February 13, 1973 in Roldanillo, Valle del Cauca) is a male professional road cyclist from Colombia.

Career

1996
1st in Stage 3 Vuelta a Colombia, Bucaramanga (COL)
2001
1st in Stage 3 Clásico RCN, Anserma (COL)
2003
1st in  National Championship, Road, ITT, Elite, Colombia, Villavicencio (COL)
1st in Stage 3 Vuelta al Tolima, El Fresno (COL)
1st in General Classification Vuelta al Tolima (COL)
1st in Stage 1 Volta do Rio de Janeiro, Angra dos Reis (BRA)
1st in Stage 2 Volta do Rio de Janeiro, Nova Friburgo (BRA)
1st in General Classification Volta do Rio de Janeiro (BRA)
3rd in  National Championship, Road, Elite, Colombia, Villavicencio (COL)
1st in Stage 2 GP Mundo Ciclistico, Funza (COL)
1st in General Classification GP Mundo Ciclistico (COL)
3rd in General Classification Clasica Integración de la Guadua-Gobernación de Risaralda (COL)
1st in Stage 12 Vuelta a Colombia, La Union (COL)
2004
1st in Stage 4 Vuelta a Uraba, Apartadó. (COL)
1st in General Classification Vuelta a Uraba (COL)
1st in Stage 5 Vuelta a Boyacà, Tunja (COL)
1st in Stage 12 Vuelta a Colombia, Funza (COL)
1st in Stage 3 Clásica Ciudad de Girardot, Girardot (COL)
3rd in General Classification Clásica Ciudad de Girardot (COL)
2005
2nd in  National Championship, Road, Elite, Colombia (COL)
1st in Stage 1 Vuelta al Tolima, Icononzo (COL)
1st in Stage 5 Clásica Nacional Marco Fidel Suárez, Bello circuit (COL)
2006
3rd in General Classification Clásica de Fusagasugá (COL)
1st in Stage 10 Vuelta a Colombia, Buga (COL) +
alongside Alejandro Cortés, Fabio Duarte, Jhon García, Javier Alberto González, Edwin Parra, Juan Diego Ramírez, Daniel Rincón, and Javier Zapata
2007
1st in Stage 1 Clásico RCN, Villanueva (COL)
1st in Points Classification Clásico RCN (COL)

References

 

1973 births
Living people
Sportspeople from Valle del Cauca Department
Colombian male cyclists
Vuelta a Colombia stage winners
20th-century Colombian people
21st-century Colombian people
Competitors at the 2006 Central American and Caribbean Games